The Broadway-Dousman Historic District is located in Green Bay, Wisconsin. It was added to both the State and the National Register of Historic Places in 1999.

References

Historic districts on the National Register of Historic Places in Wisconsin
National Register of Historic Places in Brown County, Wisconsin